NY-1 or NY 1 may refer to:

 NY1, a local 24-hour cable news television channel
 Consolidated NY-1, an aircraft
 New York's 1st congressional district
 U.S. Route 1 in New York
 New York State Route 1 (1924–1927), a previous designation for the portion of U.S. Route 1 in New York